Alan Couch (born 15 March 1953) is a Welsh former professional footballer. He played in the Football League as a midfielder for Cardiff City.

Career
Born in Neath, Couch began his career with Cardiff City, playing in the club's youth team when they reached the final of the FA Youth Cup in 1971. He made his first-team debut on 27 November 1971 in a 2–1 defeat to Carlisle United and kept his place for the following two league matches. However, he made no further appearances during the remainder of the 1971–72 season and, after struggling to break into the first-team the following season, he left to join Barry Town in 1973.

References

1953 births
Welsh footballers
Footballers from Neath
Cardiff City F.C. players
Barry Town United F.C. players
English Football League players
Southern Football League players
Association football midfielders
Living people